China competed in the 1996 Asian Winter Games which were held in Harbin, China from February 4, 1996 to February 11, 1996.

See also
 China at the Asian Games
 China at the Olympics
 Sports in China

Asian Games
China at the Asian Winter Games
Nations at the 1996 Asian Winter Games